José Anastácio de Albuquerque (born December 7, 1975 in Senador José Porfírio, Pará) is a Brazilian boxer, who represented his native country in the flyweight division at the 2000 Summer Olympics in Sydney, Australia. There he was eliminated in the first round by Ukraine's Valeriy Sydorenko.

References
UOL Esporte Profile

1975 births
Living people
Flyweight boxers
Boxers at the 2000 Summer Olympics
Olympic boxers of Brazil
Brazilian male boxers
Sportspeople from Pará